Huicochea is a derived Basque surname. Notable people with the surname include:

 Fidel Rubí Huicochea (born 1982), Mexican politician
 Heriberto Huicochea (born 1962), Mexican politician

Basque-language surnames